Miyuki is a feminine Japanese given name.

Possible writings
Miyuki can be written using different kanji characters and can mean:
, "beautiful fortune" or "beautiful happiness"
, "deep snow"
, "beautiful snow"
, "beautiful reason for history"
, "happiness" or "good fortune"
The name can also be written in hiragana or katakana.

People with the name
Miyuki (Epcot), candy sculptor appearing in the Japanese pavilion in the Epcot Center at Walt Disney World
, Japanese volleyball player
, Japanese high jumper
, Japanese singer
, Japanese freestyle skier
, former Japanese first lady, wife of Yukio Hatoyama, formerly performed as an actress Miyuki Waka at the Takarazuka Revue
Miyuki Iguchi, Japanese athlete
, Japanese television personality, idol, actress and singer
, Japanese midwife and serial killer
, Japanese women's footballer
, Japanese actress, model and singer
, Japanese volleyball player
, Japanese alpine skier
, Japanese women's basketball player
, Japanese enka singer
, Japanese manga artist
, Japanese writer
, Japanese sprint canoeist
, Japanese model
, Japanese actress and singer
, Japanese actress
, Japanese badminton player
, Japanese fencer
, Japanese actress
, Japanese artistic gymnast
, Japanese voice actress
, Japanese karateka
, Japanese writer
, Japanese field hockey player
, Japanese singer
, Japanese graphic designer
, Japanese actress
, Japanese curler
, Japanese voice actress
, Japanese volleyball player
, Japanese sprint canoeist
Miyuki Tai (born 1980), Japanese badminton player
, Japanese volleyball player
, Japanese pentathlete
Miyuki Tanobe, Canadian painter
, Japanese voice actress
, Japanese long-distance runner
, Japanese murderer
, Japanese singer, actress and idol
, Japanese rower
, Japanese women's footballer

Fictional characters
, a character in the anime film Tokyo Godfathers
, protagonist of the manga series Miyuki-chan in Wonderland
, a character in the video game Ordyne
Miyuki Aiba, a character in the anime series Tekkaman Blade
, a character in the manga series The Prince of Tennis
, a character in the anime series Smile PreCure! 
, a character in the anime series Angel Beats!
, a character in the video game Xenosaga
, protagonist of the manga series You're Under Arrest
, a character in the manga series The Kindaichi Case Files
, a character in the manga series Gender-Swap at the Delinquent Academy
, a character in the tokusatsu series Mahō Sentai Magiranger
, a character in the manga series Strawberry Panic
, a character in the novel series Red Data Girl
, a character in the light novel series The Irregular at Magic High School
, a character in the manga series Kaguya-sama: Love Is War
Miyuki Sone (曽根 美雪), a character in the visual novel YOU and ME and HER: A Love Story
, a character in the visual novel Triangle Heart
, a character in the manga series Lucky Star
, a character in the tokusatsu series Kamen Rider Blade

References

Japanese feminine given names